Pavlovka may refer to:
Pavlovka, Russia, several inhabited localities in Russia
Pavlovka (meteorite), a meteorite that fell in Russia in 1882
Pavlovka, until 1999, name of Müşkür, a village in Azerbaijan